Marcel Fernandez (born 12 April 1929) was a French racing cyclist. He rode in the 1951 Tour de France.

References

1929 births
Possibly living people
French male cyclists